The 1975 Atlanta Braves season was the tenth season in Atlanta along with the 105th season as a franchise overall and the 100th in the National League.

Offseason 
 November 2, 1974: Hank Aaron was traded by the Braves to the Milwaukee Brewers for Dave May and a player to be named later. The Brewers completed the deal by sending Roger Alexander (minors) to the Braves on December 2.
 November 8, 1974: Danny Frisella was traded by the Braves to the San Diego Padres for Cito Gaston.
 December 3, 1974: The Braves traded a player to be named later and cash to the Chicago White Sox for Dick Allen. The Braves completed the deal by sending Jim Essian to the White Sox on May 15, 1975.
 March 28, 1975: Paul Casanova was released by the Braves.
 March 29, 1975: Jack Pierce was traded by the Braves to the Detroit Tigers for Reggie Sanders.

Regular season

Season standings

Record vs. opponents

Notable transactions 
 April 4, 1975: Leo Foster was traded by the Braves to the New York Mets for Joe Nolan.
 May 7, 1975: Dick Allen and Johnny Oates were traded by the Braves to the Philadelphia Phillies for Jim Essian, Barry Bonnell, and $150,000.
 May 28, 1975: Ron Reed and a player to be named later were traded by the Braves to the St. Louis Cardinals for Elías Sosa and Ray Sadecki. The Braves completed the deal by sending Wayne Nordhagen to the Cardinals on June 2.
 June 3, 1975: 1975 Major League Baseball draft
Gary Cooper was drafted by the Braves in the 3rd round.
Glenn Hubbard was drafted by the Braves in the 20th round.
 June 7, 1975: Roric Harrison was traded by the Braves to the Cleveland Indians for Blue Moon Odom and a player to be named later. The Indians completed the deal by sending Rob Belloir to the Braves at June 16.
 June 16, 1975: Rick Mahler was signed by the Braves as an amateur free agent.

Managerial turnover
The 1974 Braves had thrived under manager Clyde King upon his appointment July 24, going 38–25 to finish the year 14 games above .500.  But the 1975 club fell under the break-even mark May 23 and never recovered. They were 58–76 (.433) and 31 games behind the Cincinnati Reds when King was fired on August 29, 1975. With only a handful of games left in the season, special scout Connie Ryan, a veteran former Braves' infielder and coach, was named to finish out the string, and the club performed even more poorly under Ryan, at 9–18.

For , GM Eddie Robinson promised to hire a "firebrand" to replace the scholarly King, and in October he selected Dave Bristol as the team's new skipper. Bristol, 42, had been the third-base coach of the Montreal Expos from 1973–1975 and had previously compiled a poor record (144–209, .408) with the 1970–1972 Milwaukee Brewers. But he was hailed as an unsung contributor to "the Big Red Machine" Cincinnati dynasty, when, as Sparky Anderson's predecessor, he inserted into the lineup many of the players—like Johnny Bench, Lee May, Tommy Helms, and Gary Nolan—who proved to be key contributors to the Cincinnati championship clubs of the early 1970s.  Bristol also had led the Reds to first division finishes in each of his three full seasons (1967–1969) as manager.

Said Helms upon Bristol's hiring by the Braves: "[Bristol] has a way of letting the players know how to win and what it's like to win. He's fiery and he's tough, but he's a ballplayer's man."

Roster

Player stats

Batting

Starters by position 
Note: Pos = Position; G = Games played; AB = At bats; H = Hits; Avg. = Batting average; HR = Home runs; RBI = Runs batted in

Other batters 
Note: G = Games played; AB = At bats; H = Hits; Avg. = Batting average; HR = Home runs; RBI = Runs batted in

Pitching

Starting pitchers 
Note: G = Games pitched; IP = Innings pitched; W = Wins; L = Losses; ERA = Earned run average; SO = Strikeouts

Other pitchers 
Note: G = Games pitched; IP = Innings pitched; W = Wins; L = Losses; ERA = Earned run average; SO = Strikeouts

Relief pitchers 
Note: G = Games pitched; W = Wins; L = Losses; SV = Saves; ERA = Earned run average; SO = Strikeouts

Farm system

Notes

References 

1975 Atlanta Braves season at Baseball Reference
Atlanta Braves at Baseball Almanac

Atlanta Braves seasons
Atlanta Braves season
Atlanta